The Shaved Woman of Chartres  is a black and white photograph taken by Robert Capa in Chartres on 16 August 1944. This picture was shortly after published in Life magazine and became iconic of the épuration sauvage (wild purge) enacted after the liberation of France and the severe punishment imposed on the French women accused of so-called horizontal collaboration with the German occupiers.

History and description
A week after the liberation of Paris, women deemed as collaborators of the Nazi regime, especially those who had been romantically or sexually involved with German men, were being punished in France with head shaving and were often paraded through the streets as a way of humiliation, before usually being sent to jail. The picture depicts one of these women, Simone Touseau, 23 years old, who had been a translator working for the Germans and was in a relationship with a German soldier since 1941, and who bore him a daughter, still a baby when the event took place. She was also accused of denouncing neighbours, who ended up being deported, which she denied. The picture depicts her, carrying her daughter on her arms, after the humiliating head shaving had taken place and her forehead had been marked in red with an iron as a sign of collaborationism, while she is being paraded in the streets of Chartres, followed by a number of people, including women, children and policemen. Her father walks ahead, carrying a bag, while her mother, who also suffered the same punishment, is partially covered by him. She is being escorted home, from where she would go to jail.

This case and the picture in particular were the subject of the documentary La Tondue de Chartres (2017), directed by Patrick Cabouat.

Public collections
A print of the photograph is held at the collection of the International Center of Photography in New York.

References

1944 in France
1944 photographs
Photographs by Robert Capa
Black-and-white photographs
French collaboration during World War II
World War II photographs